Solomon Hirsch (March 25, 1839 – December 15, 1902) was a businessman and United States politician from the state of Oregon. He was one of the leaders of Portland's early Jewish community.

Biography
He served as president of the Oregon State Senate during the 1880 session. He was a Republican.

He served as Envoy Extraordinary and Minister Plenipotentiary to the Ottoman Empire from 1889 to 1892.

Hirsch was buried at Beth Israel Cemetery in Portland, Oregon.

Family and legacy

Hirsch's wife Josephine was the leader of the Portland Equal Suffrage League. Josephine was the daughter of Solomon's business partner Jacob Mayer; they had 4 children: of Ella Hirsch (born 1871); Sanford Hirsch (born 1873); May Hirsch (born 1875), and Clementine Hirsch (born 1880). Like his partner Louis Fleischner, Hirsch's brother :de:Edward Hirsch served as Oregon State Treasurer.

A wing at the Portland Art Museum was dedicated to Solomon and Josephine Hirsch in 1939 after their daughter Ella bequeathed $853,000 ($ in  dollars) to the museum.

References

External links
The Hirsch Family (PDF) from Willamette Heritage Center
Hon. Solomon Hirsch, Portland, Oregon, Its History and Builders
Oregon, the Jewish Encyclopedia
The Pacific Monthly, January 1903

Jews and Judaism in Portland, Oregon
Jewish American people in Oregon politics
Presidents of the Oregon State Senate
Republican Party Oregon state senators
Ambassadors of the United States to Turkey
1839 births
1902 deaths
Politicians from Portland, Oregon
19th-century American politicians
19th-century American diplomats